William Michael Fennelly (born May 14, 1957) is an American basketball coach who is currently the head women's basketball coach at Iowa State University.

Coaching career

Assistant coach (1977–1986)
While a student at William Penn College, Fennelly became a volunteer assistant coach with the William Penn women's basketball team in 1977. After graduating with a bachelor's degree in business administration and economics in 1979, Fennelly became a full-time assistant coach with William Penn. Fennelly moved up to the Division I level as an assistant coach at Fresno State from 1981 to 1986 and Notre Dame from 1986 to 1988.

Toledo (1988–1995)
At the University of Toledo, Fennelly was head coach from 1988 to 1995 and had a cumulative record of 166–53, with a .758 winning percentage that remains the best in the Mid-American Conference. He had six seasons with 20 or more wins and six postseason tournament berths. Toledo made the National Women's Invitational Tournament in 1989, 1990, and 1994 and were NWIT runners-up in 1990, and the NCAA tournament in 1991, 1992, and 1995.

Iowa State (1995–present)
On July 10, 1995, Iowa State hired Fennelly as women's basketball head coach. Iowa State had only five winning seasons in the 22 previous seasons. As of the 2016–17 season, Fennelly has led Iowa State to 17 appearances in the NCAA Tournament, including Elite Eight qualifications in 1999 and 2009 and the Sweet Sixteen in 2000, 2001, and 2010. Iowa State has spent considerable time in the Associated Press national poll, including 34 weeks in the Top 10. On March 23, 2007, Iowa State extended Fennelly through 2019 in a contract worth $10.6 million.

Attendance also grew during Fennelly's tenure from the hundreds prior to his hiring to nearly 10,000 in the 2010s. In 2004, Iowa State had its first-ever sellout in a WNIT and NIT doubleheader against Saint Joseph's. In the 2011–12 season, Iowa State averaged an attendance of 10,125, third in the nation behind Tennessee and Louisville.

Fennelly was a finalist for the Naismith Coach of the Year Award in 2001, 2002, and 2005. The Women's Basketball Coaches Association named him the District 5 Coach of the Year in 1999 and 2005. In 1998, Fennelly finished as the 1998 runner-up behind Pat Summitt of Tennessee for the Associated Press Women’s Coach of the Year award.

USA Basketball
Fennelly served as an assistant coach of the  U18 team representing the US at the 2008 FIBA Americas U18 Championship for Women in Buenos Aires, Argentina. The USA team won all five of their games, including the championship game against the host team, Argentina. The team won the final game 81–37 to claim the gold medal.

Fennelly continued his position as an assistant coach as the U18 team became the  U19 team, and competed in the FIBA Women's U19 World Championship. The USA lost the opening round game against Spain 90–86, but then went on to win their next eight games. In the quarterfinals, the USA team faced France, which held an eight-point lead late in the second half, but the USA team took back the lead and won by eleven to advance to the semifinals. After beating Canada in the semifinals, they had a rematch against Spain, for the championship. This time the USA jumped out to an early lead, with a score of 33–16 at the end of the first quarter. The USA went on to win 87–71 to win the gold medal.

Fennelly was named the head coach of the USA representative to the 2011 World University Games (also known as the Universiade) which were held in Shenzhen, China. The USA team won all six games, behind the scoring leadership of Elena Delle Donne who scored almost 16 points per game. Although the championship game was against Taiwan, the closest contest was the semifinal game against Australia. That game remained close until the fourth quarter, when a 9–0 run extended the margin and helped secure the 79–67 victory.

Personal
Fennelly was born and raised in Davenport, Iowa. He and his wife, Deb, have two sons, Billy and Steven, both of whom also worked for their father's coaching staff at Iowa State. Billy was director of player development from 2010 to 2012 before becoming an assistant coach at Iowa State. Steven was a graduate assistant at Iowa State from 2011 to 2013.

Head coaching record
Source for Toledo:

Sources for Iowa State:

References

1957 births
Living people
American women's basketball coaches
Basketball coaches from Iowa
Fresno State Bulldogs women's basketball coaches
Iowa State Cyclones women's basketball coaches
Notre Dame Fighting Irish women's basketball coaches
Sportspeople from Davenport, Iowa
Toledo Rockets women's basketball coaches
William Penn University alumni